The spot-flanked barbet (Tricholaema lacrymosa) is a species of bird in the Lybiidae family.
It is found in Burundi, Democratic Republic of the Congo, Kenya, Rwanda, South Sudan, Tanzania, Uganda, and Zambia.

References

spot-flanked barbet
Birds of East Africa
spot-flanked barbet
Taxonomy articles created by Polbot